The 2024 Women's Africa Cup of Nations, (also referred to as WAFCON 2024) officially known as the 2024 TotalEnergies Women's Africa Cup of Nations for sponsorship purposes, will be the 15th edition of the biennial African international women's football tournament organized by the Confederation of African Football (CAF), hosted by Morocco 2024.

South Africa will be the  defending champions, having won the previous edition in   2022.

Host selection
Morocco were announced as hosts on 10 August 2022. This is the second time a North African Arab country has hosted the Women's Africa Cup of Nations, the second consecutive edition played in Morocco.

Qualification

Morocco qualified automatically as hosts, while the remaining spots will be determined by the qualifying rounds.

Qualified teams
The following teams have qualified for the tournament.

Venues

References

External links

2024
2020s in Moroccan sport
Women Cup of Nations
2024 in women's association football
International association football competitions hosted by Morocco